Mikhail Alekseevich Chipurin (born 17 November 1980) is a former Russian handball player for the Russian national team.

In 2004 he was a member of the Russian team which won the bronze medal in the Olympic tournament. He played all eight matches and scored six goals.

References

External links

1980 births
Living people
Russian male handball players
Olympic handball players of Russia
Handball players at the 2004 Summer Olympics
Olympic bronze medalists for Russia
Olympic medalists in handball
Sportspeople from Moscow
Expatriate handball players
Russian expatriates in France
Medalists at the 2004 Summer Olympics
RK Vardar players